Mahipalgad Fortis a fort located from Belgaum. It is in the Chandgad taluka of  Kolhapur district, of Maharashtra. This fort is an important fort in Kolhapur district. The fort is situated on the mountain ridge close to the line dividing Maharashtra and Karnataka state. The fort is amidst dense evergreen forest.

History
The fort is said to be built by Shivaji Maharaj.

How to reach
The nearest town is Belgaum. The base village of the fort is Dewarwadi which is 20 km from Belgaum. There is a good motorbike road up to the fort and requires a drive of 45 minutes from Belgaum. There are good hotels at Belgaum. There are regular buses from belgaum to Dewarwadi.

Places to see
There is a Vaijanath temple on the road to the fort. This temple is believed to be built in 11th century in Hemadpanti style. There is a majestic stone cut Nandi bull in front of the temple. Adjacent to the temple is the temple of goddess Aarogya Bhavani. The pillars of the temple are beautifully carved. There is a sacred water (tirtha) cistern behind the temple. On the way to the fort are rock cut caves called Mahipalgad caves. The fort has a good entrance gate with walls encircling the Mahipalgad village. There is a one-storey citadel inside the fort which is 70 ft long and 40 ft wide. There is a water cistern and a temple of Ambabai goddess behind the citadel. The bastion on the eastern side is in good condition, there is a Shiva temple near the bastion. Most of the structures and remains are built in laterite rock.

See also 
 List of forts in Maharashtra
 List of forts in India
 Marathi People
 List of Maratha dynasties and states
 List of people involved in the Maratha Empire

References 

Buildings and structures of the Maratha Empire
Forts in Kolhapur district
16th-century forts in India
Tourist attractions in Kolhapur district